Sunset Cemetery, located at 2000 Leavenworth Street in Manhattan, Kansas, is the oldest cemetery in the city and is one of two cemeteries owned by the city.

History
Manhattan was founded in 1855 and incorporated in 1857. A committee was formed for the creation of a cemetery according to the city council minutes of July 5, 1858. This committee failed in its task and a second committee was appointed on June 9, 1859. The committee recommended in April 1860 the purchase of land claimed by John Flagg, but this recommendation was not accepted by the city council. A third cemetery committee was appointed and it reported on April 18, 1860 that an agreement had not been reached by the members. A fourth cemetery committee was appointed on June 16, 1860. The land chosen by the fourth committee was claimed by Clark M. Lewis, but he could not provide clear title. In August 1860, Lewis transferred the recommended land to John Pipher with the condition that he should give a warranty deed for the land to the city. Pipher sold  acres to the city in August 1860 for $610. 

The first block plotted into burial lots lies in the northeast corner of the cemetery. The layout of blocks continued westward until 1900 when the burial lots reached a significant ravine. The city offered a contest prize of $10 to anyone who could offer a suitable layout for the land on the west side of the ravine. No records exist noting the payment of the prize

In 1901, Benjamin F. Miller deeded an additional  to the city in his will. This land was north of the northeast corner and designated for cemetery purposes only. In 1929, Manhattan residents approved a bond vote for $12,000 to purchase  from Delmar Wickham.

The first grave is not officially recorded, but tradition claims that it was Juliet Whitehorn, who died of typhoid fever in November 1860.

The first superintendent was Charles Barnes, who was appointed July 6, 1863 and salaried at $25 per year.

Most of Manhattan's early settlers, business owners, and politicians are buried in Sunset Cemetery. A large number of the early faculty members of Kansas State Agricultural College (now Kansas State University) are interred there as well.

A small portion of cemetery land lies outside of the walls to the east. This land contains the sexton's home and office, as well as Denison Circle, a granite boulder monument recognizing the contributions of the first KSAC President Joseph J. Denison and Manhattan's earliest settlers.

Presently, interments are continuing, but all lots have been sold. The city created Sunrise Cemetery , located at 2901 Stagg Hill Road, which is actively receiving interments.

Notable interments

See also

 List of cemeteries in Kansas

Notes

References
 Amos, Wayne (ed.) Sunset Cemetery: Manhattan, Kansas (Manhattan, KS: s.n.), 1936.
 Riley County Genealogical Society. Sunset Cemetery: Manhattan, Kansas (Manhattan, KS: Riley County Genealogical Society), 1979.

External links
 
 Sunset Cemetery history by the Riley County Genealogical Society

1860 establishments in Kansas Territory
Manhattan, Kansas
Cemeteries in Kansas